Lokotki is a rural locality (a village) in Ufa, Bashkortostan, Russia. The population was 153 as of 2010. There is 1 street.

Geography 
Lokotki is located 24 km south of Ufa. Atayevka is the nearest rural locality.

References 

Rural localities in Ufa urban okrug